Frank Amankwah (born 29 December 1971, in Obuasi) is a Ghanaian football player.

International career
Amankwah was a member of the Men's National Team that won the bronze medal at the 1992 Summer Olympics in Barcelona, Spain. Frank Amankwah now lives in London

References

External links
 
 
 
 
 

1971 births
Living people
Ghanaian footballers
Ghanaian expatriate footballers
Iraklis Thessaloniki F.C. players
Footballers at the 1992 Summer Olympics
Olympic footballers of Ghana
Olympic bronze medalists for Ghana
1996 African Cup of Nations players
Asante Kotoko S.C. players
People from Obuasi
Olympic medalists in football
2. Bundesliga players
Medalists at the 1992 Summer Olympics
Association football defenders
Ghana international footballers
Ghanaian expatriate sportspeople in Germany
Expatriate footballers in Germany
Ghanaian expatriate sportspeople in Greece
Expatriate footballers in Greece